The Afghanistan cricket team toured Ireland in July 2016 to play five One Day Internationals (ODIs) matches at Stormont, Belfast. It was the first time Ireland played a five-match ODI series. The series was drawn 2–2, with the first match being abandoned due to rain.

Squads

Nasir Jamal, Imran Janat and Afsar Zazai were named as reserve players for Afghanistan.

ODI series

1st ODI

2nd ODI

3rd ODI

4th ODI

5th ODI

References

External links
 Series home at ESPN Cricinfo

2016 in Afghan cricket
2016 in Irish cricket
International cricket competitions in 2016
Afghan cricket tours of Ireland